Pallavaram (originally Pallava Puram) is a residential neighborhood of Chennai, India. Pallavaram was a part of Alandur until August 2015 and since then a new taluk with headquarters at Pallavaram was created. The town is known for its cantonment and bustling residential colonies and is served by Pallavaram railway station of the Chennai Suburban Railway Network. It was merged with Tambaram Municipal Corporation.

Pallavaram has a long history and has been inhabited since the Paleolithic Age. The town derives its name from the Pallava settlement of Pallavapuram of which it used to form a part. The cantonment and aerodrome were established during British rule. The British also carried out charnockite mining activities on Pallavaram Hill.

History
Pallavaram is considered to be one of the oldest inhabited places in South India. A major archaeological find was made in the year 1863 when the British archaeologist Robert Bruce Foote discovered a stone implement from the Paleolithic Age inside a ballast pit. Since then, a number of Stone Age artifacts have been uncovered. Most of these artifacts are currently lodged in the Egmore museum.

Together with Chromepet, the Pallavaram area was referred to as "Pallavapuram." The present-day town of Pallavaram has its origins in the settlement of arshad which existed during the time of the 8th century Pallava king Mahendravarman I. The Pallavas have left titles in early Pallava script at the cave temple in Pallavaram which date back to 600 CE. The remains of a cave shrine constructed by the Pallava ruler have been found at the spot where an Islamic dargah now stands.

Both the Mughal Empire and the British East India Company had their cantonments in Pallavaram. During the 17th century, Pallavaram remained dependent for sometime, upon the Portuguese colony of San Thome. During the 18th century, the British established a cantonment at Pallavaram, supplementary to the one at St. Thomas Mount. A wireless station was established in the early years of the 20th century. The Madras aerodrome was opened at Pallavaram in 1929.

Geography 
The area of Pallavaram is divided into Zamin Pallavaram, Old Pallavaram, Essa Pallavaram and Cantonment Pallavaram.

Pallavaram Lake
Pallavaram Lake (or Pallavaram periya eri, literally meaning 'big lake'), once a sprawling water body covering about 189 acres, has shrunk to a small patch on the lines of a pond on one side and a hillock of garbage on the other. The dumping of garbage from all the 42 wards of the Pallavaram Municipality for nearly a decade is the main reason for the shrinkage of the water body. Nearly 25 acres had been lost to encroachments alone. The construction of Pallavaram–Thoraipakkam Road, a project initiated to connect Chennai Airport and Rajiv Gandhi Salai, had split the lake into two halves. The portion of the lake on the southern side of the road has completely been covered by garbage. On the northern side of the road, the discharge of sewage from commercial establishments and homes and also effluents from some of the leather manufacturing units in Nagalakeni has affected the quality of the water. This is one of the oldest Palaeolithic culture site.

Connectivity
Two major State highways are initiated from Pallavaram, namely, the SH 113A Pallavaram-Kundrathur-Poonamallee Road and the SH 109 Pallavaram - Thuraipakkam Radial Road.

Pallavapuram  Special Grade Municipality 
During 2001–2011, Pallavaram registered a population growth of 50 percent with a 2011 population of 2,16,308.

Pallavapuram Municipality was constituted as a III Grade Municipality on 17.01.1970 vide G.o.No. 55 R.D. & L.A. Department dated 12.01.1970, by Combining the following Town Panchayats and Panchayats:

1. Zamin Pallavaram Town Panchayat

2. Issa Pallavaram Town Panchayat

3. Hasthinapuram Town Panchayat

4. Kilkattalai Panchayat

5. Nemilichery Panchayat

It has been upgraded to 2nd Grade Municipality vide G.O. No. 200 R.D. & L.A. dated 10.02.1975, 1st Grade on 09.02.1983 as per R.D.& L.A. G.O. No. 651 dated 08.05.1983 and to Special Grade Municipality Vide G.O.No.238 dated.02.12.2008. 

During November 2021, Pallavaram Municipality was included in Tambaram City Municipal Corporation. 

Chromepet is a locality in Zamin Pallavaram Revenue Village under Pallavaram Municipality.

Pallavapuram Municipal office is located at G.S.T. Road, Chromepet area in Pallavaram. It is very near to Chromepet Railway Station and M.I.T. Campus.

Demographics
According to 2011 census, Pallavaram had a population of 2,15,417 with a sex-ratio of 996 females for every 1,000 males, much above the national average of 929. A total of 22,258 were under the age of six, constituting 11,253 males and 11,005 females. Scheduled Castes and Scheduled Tribes accounted for 15.88% and 0.48% of the population respectively. The average literacy of the city was 83.27%, compared to the national average of 72.99%. The city had a total of  56,135 households. There were a total of 81,669 workers, comprising 164 cultivators, 468 main agricultural labourers, 906 in house hold industries, 73,547 other workers, 6,584 marginal workers, 116 marginal cultivators, 65 marginal agricultural labourers, 326 marginal workers in household industries and 6,077 other marginal workers. As per the religious census of 2011, Pallavaram (M + OG) had 84.25% Hindus, 6.37% Muslims, 8.4% Christians, 0.04% Sikhs, 0.03% Buddhists, 0.14% Jains, 0.77% following other religions and 0.01% following no religion or did not indicate any religious preference.

References

External links

Suburbs of Chennai
Cities and towns in Chengalpattu district